Anqing railway station is a railway station in Yixiu District, Anqing, Anhui, China.

The station is the eastern terminus of the Anqing railway, a branch line from the Hefei–Jiujiang railway. It is the western terminus of the Nanjing–Anqing intercity railway. It is also the eastern terminus of a branch from the Hefei–Jiujiang high-speed railway.

History

The station opened in 1995. In 2004, a line heading east from this station to a nearby power plant was opened. This line is no longer in use, but the route east was reused by the Nanjing–Anqing intercity.

A project to upgrade the station in preparation for the opening of the Nanjing–Anqing intercity railway began in May 2014. The refurbished station opened on 3 December 2015.

References
 

Railway stations in Anhui
Railway stations in China opened in 1995.